Antequera may refer to:

Places 
 Antequera, a city and municipality Andalusia, Spain
 Antequera, Bohol, a municipality in the Philippines
 Antequera District, San Pedro Department, Paraguay

People 
 Francisco Antequera (born 1964), Spanish racing cyclist
 José de Antequera y Castro (1689–1731), lawyer, judge, and insurrectionist in the Viceroyalty of Peru
 Niña de Antequera (1920–1972), Spanish flamenco singer

Other uses 
 Antequera CF, an association football team based in Antequera, Andalusia
 BM Antequera, a handball team based in Antequera, Andalusia
 Roman Catholic Archdiocese of Antequera, Oaxaca, based in Oaxaca, Mexico
 Antequera (moth), a genus of moth